The Nikon AF-S DX Nikkor 35mm 1.8G is a lens manufactured by Nikon for use on Nikon DX format digital SLR cameras. It provides a field of view on a DX format camera similar to that of a normal lens on a 35mm film format camera.

Introduction 

Nikon announced the lens on 9 February 2009. It is the first prime lens released by Nikon specifically designed for Nikon DX format DSLR cameras that not only is rectilinear but also supports autofocus on the Nikon D40, Nikon D40X, Nikon D60, Nikon D3000, Nikon D3100, Nikon D3200, Nikon D3300, Nikon D3400, Nikon D3500, Nikon D5000, Nikon D5100, Nikon D5200, Nikon D5300, Nikon D5500, Nikon D5600 and Nikon D500. The first prime lens released for the DX format was the AF DX Fisheye-Nikkor 10.5mm 2.8G ED.

It achieved a DXOMark score of 28.

Features 

 35 mm focal length (approximately field of view equivalent to a 50 mm lens used on a 35mm format camera)
 Compact silent wave autofocus motor with full-time manual override
 Nikon F-lens mount for use with Nikon DX format DSLRs (use on Nikon FX format DSLRs will cause vignetting)
 Rear-focussing elements allow for a non-rotating lens front, enabling easier usage of rotating filters such as circular polarisers
 Dust gasket around lens mount to reduce dust entering when lens and camera are attached

Construction 

 8 lens elements in 6 groups
 1 hybrid aspherical element
 52 mm filter thread for widely distributed 52 mm filters

Target market 

The lens is intended to be an inexpensive prime lens for owners of Nikon DX format DSLR cameras. The lens was priced at 180 USD in 2020.

See also
List of Nikon F-mount lenses with integrated autofocus motor

References

External links
Lens review at Cameralabs
Nikon AF-S Nikkor 35mm 1:1.8G DX review: Digital Photography Review

Camera lenses introduced in 2009
Nikon F-mount lenses